T&D Holdings is a Japanese insurance company. It is listed on the Nikkei 225. It is based in Tokyo, Japan. 
Subsidiaries include Taiyo Life, Daido Life, T&D Financial Life, and T&D Asset Management.

In 2012, it was ranked 413 in the Fortune Global 500 list, with USD $26.6bn in revenue. Assets — $123.7 billion (2015).

References

External links 
 

Companies listed on the Tokyo Stock Exchange
Companies listed on the Osaka Exchange
Insurance companies of Japan